The 2014–15 Georgetown Hoyas women's basketball team will represent Georgetown University in the 2014–15 college basketball season. The Hoyas were led by 1st year head coach Natasha Adair and Were members of the Big East Conference. The Hoyas will play their home games at the McDonough Gymnasium. They finished the season 4–27, 2–16 in Big East play to finish in last place. They lost in the first round of the Big East women's tournament to Xavier.

Roster

Schedule

|-
!colspan=9 style="background:#D7D7D7; color:#003366;"| Regular Season

|-
!colspan=9 style="background:#003366;"| 2015 Big East tournament

References

Georgetown
Georgetown Hoyas women's basketball seasons